CDG Capital S.A. is a Moroccan investment bank founded in 2006. It is a wholly owned subsidiary of the Moroccan Caisse de dépôt et de gestion (CDG).

History 
CDG Capital is a wholly owned subsidiary of Caisse de dépôt et de gestion (CDG), created in February 2006 as part of CDG's strategy of decentralising business units, with the aim of providing a sounder legal and statutory operating framework for the group of companies. In 2014, Fitch Ratings gave the company a "highest standards" Asset Manager rating.

Assets 
Figures for 2010

By asset type:
 MAD 149 billion (bonds and shares)
 MAD  318 billion (deposits)
 MAD  3 billion (venture capital)

By market segment:
 Primary markets: 24%
 Secondary markets: 23%

See also 
 Caisse de dépôt et de gestion
 CDG Développement

References

External links 
 Official website
 Official website of Caisse de dépôt et de gestion
 Official website of CDG Capital Online Market

Financial services companies established in 2006
Banks established in 2006